Showta Best (stylized as SHOWTA. BEST) is a compilation album by Showta (currently known as Shouta Aoi). The album was released on July 6, 2016.

Background and release

Before entering voice acting under the stage name Shouta Aoi, Aoi had previously released music with King Records under the stage name Showta from 2006 to 2009. After Aoi left B-green and returned to King Records in 2016, King Records re-released his previous songs as a compilation album.

Showta Best was released on July 6, 2016. The limited version of the album included an alternate cover and a DVD containing all five music videos Aoi had released during the time he performed as Showta.

Music

Showta Best compiles songs from Showta's six singles released from 2006 to 2008 and his debut album Eve. The album also included "Ekubo", a song performed for the soundtrack for Kanna-san Daiseikō Desu! the Movie, which was released as a promotional digital single.

Reception

The album debuted at #19 in the Oricon Weekly Albums Chart, charting for 5 weeks. The album peaked at #21 on the Billboard Japan Top Album Sales, selling 4,799 copies.

Track listing

Charts

Notes

References

External links

 

Shouta Aoi albums
2016 greatest hits albums